Darrell Cavens (born 1972) is an executive who was the co-founder and former CEO of the e-commerce company Zulily, which was acquired by QVC in 2015 for $2.6 billion.

Career
Prior to Zulily, Cavens held executive positions with Microsoft and online jewelry retailer Blue Nile.

In 2009, Cavens and Mark Vadon co-founded Zulily, a flash-sales site focused on children’s products. The site launched in 2010. Zulily went public in November 2013. Cavens retained 21.6 percent of the voting power following the IPO.  In 2014, Cavens won Ernst & Young’s Entrepreneur of the Year for e-commerce. 

In August 2015, Zulily was acquired by Liberty Interactive/QVC for 2.4 billion. Cavens remained as CEO of the company until January 2018 when he became President of New Ventures for newly-reorganized parent company Qurate Retail Group. 

In March 2016, Cavens was named to Madrona Venture Labs’ advisory board. In 2017, Cavens joined the Board of Directors at OfferUp. In July 2018, Cavens was appointed to the board of directors for Tapestry, Inc.

References

1972 births
Living people
University of Victoria alumni